Veulettes-sur-Mer (literally Veulettes on Sea) is a commune in the Seine-Maritime department in the Normandy region in northern France.

Geography
The river Durdent flows to the sea here through the pebble beach (the longest in the department at 2 km) and huge chalk cliffs which rise up to face the sea .

Heraldry

Population

Places of interest

 The church of St. Valery, dating from the twelfth century.
 A sixteenth-century stone cross.
 The cliffs.

People
 Jean-Jacques Servan-Schreiber (1924–2006) journalist, essayist and politician lived here.

See also
Communes of the Seine-Maritime department

References

External links

Full INSEE database 

Communes of Seine-Maritime
Seaside resorts in France